is a railway station in Yokohama, Japan, operated by Tokyu Corporation. The station is part of the Tōkyū Shin-Yokohama Line.

The station opened on 18 March 2023.

Line 

Station Layout 
Shin-tsunashima Station is underground and features an island platform with two tracks. The fare gate concourse is 1-story underground while the platform level is 4-story underground. The concourse is decorated in pink, while the platforms are in cyan to symbolize Tsurumi River.

The station is close to Tsunashima Station which is served by the Tokyu .

Platforms

Naming
Between August and September 2020, Tokyu Corporation held a public survey to decide the name of this station. The questionnaire asked the participants to choose between "Shin-tsunashima" (lit. New Tsunashima) and "Higashi-tsunashima" (東綱島, lit. East Tsunashima) or suggest a different name which is not "Tsunashima". The survey saw 1898 people submitted their answers. "Shin-tsunashima" won with 381 votes. "Tsunashima-onsen" (綱島温泉, lit. Tsunashima Hot-spring) was the most popular free suggestion with 247 votes, more than the 176 votes of "Higashi-tsunashima". Other notable suggestions were "Tsunashima Higashi" (綱島東) and "Ōtsunabashi" (大綱橋).

Ticketing
Because of the close proximity between Shin-tsunashina and Tsunashima stations, all fares between Shin-tsunashima and Hiyoshi are the same as between Tsunashima and Hiyoshi. All season/commuter passes which cover the section between Tsunashima and Hiyoshi allow entering/exiting Shin-tsunashima without additional charge, and vice versa. However, there is no free out-of-station interchange arrangement between Shin-tsunashima and Tsunashima. Exiting one station and entering the other station is treated as starting a separate journey.

References

External links 

 Station website (in Japanese)
 Station map (in Japanese)

Railway stations in Japan opened in 2023
Stations of Tokyu Corporation
2023 establishments in Japan
Railway stations in Yokohama